Gărâna Jazz Festival is a four day music festival taking place annually in July in Gărâna, southwestern Romania. The Festival launched in 1996 and in the intervening years has raised the profile of Gărâna, a small village in the Western Carpathians. The festival has featured an impressive lineup of high-class artists — including Eberhard Weber, Mike Stern, Jan Garbarek, Charles Lloyd, Jean-Luc Ponty, Victor Wooten, Béla Fleck, Stanley Jordan, John Abercrombie, Miroslav Vitouš (the original bassist of jazz fusion band Weather Report), Zakir Hussain, Magnus Öström, Bugge Wesseltoft, Lars Danielsson, Avishay Cohen, and Nils Petter Molvær.

See also 

 Jazz festivals in Romania

References

External links 

 Gărâna Jazz official homepage

Jazz festivals in Romania
Music festivals established in 1997
Summer events in Romania
1997 establishments in Romania